Baranowo  is a village in the administrative district of Gmina Tarnowo Podgórne, within Poznań County, Greater Poland Voivodeship, in west-central Poland.

The village has a population of 2,202.

References

Villages in Poznań County